The Mystery of a Hansom Cab is a 1925 Australian silent film directed by and starring Arthur Shirley based on the popular novel which had already been filmed in 1911. It is considered a lost film.

Plot
Oliver Whyte is found murdered in a hansom cab in Melbourne. Brian Fitzgerald (Arthur Shirley) is arrested for the crime and brought to trial, but is acquitted at the last minute by Sal Rawlin, a missing witness who produces an alibi. The mystery involves Brian's fiancée, Madge (Grace Glover).

Cast
Arthur Shirley as Brian Fitzgerald
Grace Glover as Madge
Roland Stavey as detective
Cora Warner as Mother Guttersnipe
Isa Crossley as Sal Rawlin
Godfrey Cass
Vera Remee
Isa Millett
Sydney Stirling
Carlton Stuart
Leslie Woods
Frank Barnes
Arthur Orbell
Charles Vincent
John Bruce
Billie Sim

Background
This was Shirley's directorial debut. He had started filming a South Seas romance called The Throwback in 1920 but had been unable to complete it. He subsequently sued his cinematographer, Ernest Higgins, but lost the case and had to declare bankruptcy.

Shirley managed to recover and establish a new company, Pyramid Pictures, with the backing of several Melbourne businessman, including Gilbert M. Johnson. Pyramid signed Shirley to a seven-year contract in April 1924, at £20 a week while making a movie, £15 a week otherwise.

Cora Warner, who appeared in the support cast, ran the theatrical boarding house in Woolloomooloo where Shirley was staying.

Production
Filming began in February 1924 and took five months to photograph. Many of the scenes were in Melbourne on the steps of Parliament House, in the Fitzroy Gardens, and also St. Kilda Road. Interiors were shot in Sydney at a studio in Rushcutters Bay. It was the first movie in Australia to run for ten reels and use double exposure.

Reception
The movie received good reviews and was a major commercial success, with The Sydney Morning Herald saying that it played "to a greatly interested audience."

References

External links

The Mystery of a Hansom Cab (1925 version) at National Film and Sound Archive

1925 drama films
1925 films
Australian black-and-white films
Australian drama films
Australian silent feature films
Films set in colonial Australia
Lost Australian films
1925 lost films
Lost drama films
Films directed by Arthur Shirley
Silent drama films